Universal Magazines (now Universal Media Co.) is an Australian publisher of magazines, websites, and calendar products that cater to niche markets. Prema Perera is currently CEO of the company.

In 2018, Universal Magazines rebranded as Universal Media Co, taking into account the increasing importance of online and new media in their business model. In 2019, Universal Magazines sold Pool+Spa to the Swimming Pool and Spa Association of Australia.

Media brands

Home

Lifestyle
{{Columns-list|colwidth=20em|
 Australian Country
 Dogs Life
 WellBeing
 Wellbeing.com.au"'
 dogslife.com.au "Wild"
 "Being"}}

Motorbike

Craft

B2B
 Outdoor Design Source outdoordesign.com.au''

References

External links
 Universal Media Co website
 Universal Shop (Subscription site)

Magazine publishing companies of Australia
1986 establishments in Australia
Publishing companies established in 1986
Mass media in New South Wales